Pauline Heßler (born 13 September 1998) is a German ski jumper. She has competed at World Cup level since the 2014/15 season, with her best individual result being 18th place in Pyeongchang on 15 February 2017. At the Junior World Championships, she won team gold medals in 2015 and 2017, and team bronze in 2013.

Nordic World Ski Championships results

References

External links

1998 births
Living people
German female ski jumpers
Ski jumpers at the 2022 Winter Olympics
Olympic ski jumpers of Germany
21st-century German women